A Nipah virus infection is a viral infection caused by the Nipah virus. Symptoms from infection vary from none to fever, cough, headache, shortness of breath, and confusion. This may worsen into a coma over a day or two, and 50 to 75% of those infected die. Complications can include inflammation of the brain and seizures following recovery.

The Nipah virus (NiV) is a type of RNA virus in the genus Henipavirus. The virus normally circulates among some fruit bats. It can both spread between people and from other animals to people. Spread typically requires direct contact with an infected source. Diagnosis is based on symptoms and confirmed by laboratory testing.

Management is restricted to supportive care;  there is neither vaccine nor specific treatment. Preventive measures include avoiding exposure to bats and sick pigs, and not drinking raw date palm sap. As of May 2018 about 700 human cases of Nipah virus were estimated to have occurred, and 50 to 75 percent of those infected died. In May 2018, an outbreak of the disease caused 17 deaths in the Indian state of Kerala.

The disease was first identified in 1998 by a team of researchers at the Faculty of Medicine, University of Malaya during an outbreak in Malaysia. The majority of the patients in Malaysia diagnosed with the disease were referred to and treated at the University of Malaya Medical Centre. The virus was isolated and identified in 1999. The disease is named after a village in Malaysia, Sungai Nipah. Pigs may also be infected, and millions were killed by Malaysian authorities in 1999 to stop the spread of disease, a measure which proved to be successful.

Signs and symptoms 

Human infections range from asymptomatic infection to acute respiratory infection, seizures and fatal encephalitis. This illness typically initially presents as 3-14 days of fever and headache, often accompanied by a cough, sore throat, difficulty breathing, and other signs of respiratory illness. Infected people initially develop symptoms that include fever, headaches, myalgia, vomiting and sore throat. This can be followed by dizziness, drowsiness, altered consciousness, and neurological signs that indicate acute encephalitis. Some people can also experience atypical pneumonia and severe respiratory problems, including acute respiratory distress. Encephalitis and seizures occur in severe cases, progressing to coma within 24 to 48 hours.

The incubation period is from 4 to 14 days but an incubation period as long  as 45 days has been reported.

Most people make a full recovery, although some are left with residual neurological conditions after acute encephalitis. Some cases of relapse have been reported. Death occurs in 40-75% of cases, and some long-term side effects of infection include persistent convulsions and personality changes.

Transmission 
The initial case in human outbreaks of Nipah virus has always been zoonotic from exposure to contaminated secretions or tissues of infected bats or pigs. Subsequent human-to-human transmission of Nipah virus occurs via close contact with NiV-infected persons or exposure to NiV-infected body fluids (e.g., blood, urine, nasal secretions).

Most experts do not classify Nipah virus as airborne, though there is consensus that transmission can—and does—occur from short-range exposure to NiV-infected respiratory droplets in close contact settings.

Indirect transmission of Nipah virus via contaminated fomites is likely responsible for many cases in which there was no known direct contact with a NiV-infected
person or animal.

Risks 
The risk of exposure is high for hospital workers and caretakers of those infected with the virus. In Malaysia and Singapore, Nipah virus infected people with close contact to infected pigs. In Bangladesh and India, the disease has been linked to consumption of raw date palm sap (toddy), eating of fruits partially consumed by bats, and using water from wells inhabited by bats.

Laboratory diagnosis

During acute and convalescent stages of the disease, RNA can be detected using reverse transcriptase polymerase chain reaction (RT-PCR) from throat swabs, cerebrospinal fluid, urine and blood analysis.

After recovery, IgG and IgM antibody detection can confirm a prior Nipah virus infection. Immunohistochemistry on tissues collected during autopsy also confirms the disease.

Prevention 

Prevention through sanitary practices is the best protection. The likelihood of infection through animal transmission can be reduced by avoiding exposure to sick pigs, and to bats where the disease is endemic. Bats harbor a significantly higher proportion of zoonotic viruses than all other mammalian orders, and are known not to be affected by the many viruses they carry, apparently due to their developing special immune systems to deal with the stress of flying. Infection via bats can be caused by drinking raw palm sap (palm toddy) contaminated by bat excreta, eating fruits partially consumed by bats, and using water from wells infested by bats. Bats are known to drink toddy that is collected in open containers, and occasionally urinate in it, which contaminates it with the virus; switching to closed-top containers prevents transmission via this route. Outbreaks can be reduced by surveillance and awareness. The association of this disease with the reproductive cycle of bats is not well studied.

Standard infection control practices can protect against human-to-human nosocomial infections.

A subunit vaccine using the Hendra G protein was found to produce cross-protective antibodies against both henipavirus and nipahvirus; this has been used in monkeys to protect against Hendra virus, although its potential for use in humans has not been studied.

Treatment 

 there is no specific treatment for Nipah virus infection. The mainstay of treatment is supportive care. Standard infection control practices and proper barrier nursing techniques are recommended to avoid the spread of the infection from person to person. All suspected cases of Nipah virus infection should be isolated. While tentative evidence supports the use of ribavirin, it has not yet been studied in people with the disease. Specific antibodies have also been studied in an animal model with potential benefit. Acyclovir, favipiravir, and remdesivir have been assessed as potential antivirals against Nipah virus.

M 102.4 is a nonpatented monoclonal antibody developed by Christopher C. Broder, a professor of immunology and microbiology at Uniformed Services University of the Health Sciences in Maryland. It proved highly effective in animal models. 50 doses were sent to Kerala in 2018, but it is not clear if they were used in humans.

AChAdOx1 is vector based vaccination which is currently being tested on animals.

Prognosis 
Nipah virus infection is fatal in 40 to 70 percent of cases, though some outbreaks have had 100% case fatality rate.

Sequelae 
Those who survive the initial infection often struggle with debilitating long-term neurological sequelae, including memory loss, impaired cognition, seizures, convulsions, and personality changes.

Moreover, Nipah virus is known to be able to persist and lie dormant in survivors and to re-activate many months or years after the initial infection. Deaths from re-activation of latent Nipah virus have been reported.

Outbreaks 

Nipah virus outbreaks have been reported in Malaysia, Singapore, Bangladesh and India. The highest mortality due to Nipah virus infection was found in Bangladesh, where outbreaks are typically seen in winter. Nipah virus was first seen in 1998 in peninsular Malaysia in pigs and pig farmers. By mid-1999, more than 265 human cases of encephalitis, including 105 deaths, had been reported in Malaysia, and 11 cases of either encephalitis or respiratory illness with one fatality were reported in Singapore. In 2001, Nipah virus was reported from Meherpur District, Bangladesh and Siliguri, India. The outbreak again appeared in 2003, 2004 and 2005 in Naogaon District, Manikganj District, Rajbari District, Faridpur District and Tangail District. In Bangladesh there were further outbreaks in subsequent years.
 September 1998 – May 1999: in the states of Perak, Negeri Sembilan and Selangor in Malaysia. A total of 265 cases of acute encephalitis with 105 deaths caused by the virus were reported in the three states throughout the outbreak. The Malaysian health authorities at first thought Japanese encephalitis (JE) was the cause of infection which hampered the deployment of effective measures to prevent the spread of Nipah virus.
 2001: 31 January – 23 February, Siliguri, India: 66 cases with a 74% mortality rate. 75% of patients were either hospital staff or had visited one of the other patients in hospital, indicating person-to-person transmission.
 2001: April–May, Meherpur District, Bangladesh: 13 cases with nine fatalities (69% mortality).
 2003: January, Naogaon District, Bangladesh: 12 cases with eight fatalities (67% mortality).
 2004: January–February, Manikganj and Rajbari districts, Bangladesh: 42 cases with 14 fatalities (33% mortality).
 2004: 19 February – 16 April, Faridpur District, Bangladesh: 36 cases with 27 fatalities (75% mortality). 92% of cases involved close contact with at least one other person infected with Nipah virus. Two cases involved a single short exposure to an ill patient, including a rickshaw driver who transported a patient to hospital. In addition, at least six cases involved acute respiratory distress syndrome, which has not been reported previously for Nipah virus illness in humans.
 2005: January, Tangail District, Bangladesh: 12 cases with 11 fatalities (92% mortality). The virus was probably contracted from drinking date palm juice contaminated by fruit bat droppings or saliva.
 2007: February–May, Nadia District, India: up to 50 suspected cases with 3–5 fatalities. The outbreak site borders the Bangladesh district of Kushtia where eight cases of Nipah virus encephalitis with five fatalities occurred during March and April 2007. This was preceded by an outbreak in Thakurgaon during January and February affecting seven people with three deaths. All three outbreaks showed evidence of person-to-person transmission.
 2008: February–March, Manikganj and Rajbari districts, Bangladesh: Nine cases with eight fatalities.
 2010: January, Bhanga subdistrict, Faridpur, Bangladesh: Eight cases with seven fatalities. During March, one physician of the Faridpur Medical College Hospital caring for confirmed Nipah cases died.
 2011: February: An outbreak of Nipah Virus occurred at Hatibandha, Lalmonirhat, Bangladesh. The deaths of 21 schoolchildren due to Nipah virus infection were recorded on 4 February 2011. IEDCR confirmed the infection was due to this virus. Local schools were closed for one week to prevent the spread of the virus. People were also requested to avoid consumption of uncooked fruits and fruit products. Such foods, contaminated with urine or saliva from infected fruit bats, were the most likely source of this outbreak.
 2018: May: Deaths of twenty one people in Perambra near Calicut, Kerala, India were confirmed to be due to the virus. Treatment using antivirals such as Ribavirin was initiated.
 2019: June: A 23-year-old student was admitted into hospital with Nipah virus infection at Kochi in Kerala. Health Minister of Kerala K. K. Shailaja said that 86 people who had had recent interactions with the patient were under observation. This included two nurses who treated the patient, and had fever and sore throat. The situation was monitored and precautionary steps were taken to control the spread of virus by the Central and State Government. The Health Department of Kerala kept 338 people under observation, 17 of them in isolation. After undergoing treatment for 54 days at a private hospital, the 23-year-old student was discharged. On 23 July, the Kerala government declared Ernakulam district to be Nipah-free.
 2021: September: 12-year-old boy, a native of Chathamangalam village was admitted to a hospital at Kozhikode in Kerala on September 1. He died from the virus four days after admission. Two healthcare workers who came into contact with the victim were already showing symptoms of Nipah infection by Monday.
 2023: Since 4 January 2023 and as of 13 February 2023, 11 cases (10 confirmed and one probable) including eight deaths (Case Fatality Rate (CFR) 73%) have been reported in Bangladesh. WHO assesses the ongoing risk as high at the national level.

Research 
Ribavirin, m102.4 monoclonal antibody, and favipiravir were being studied as treatments as of 2019.

Medication 
Ribavirin has been studied in a small number of people.  it was unclear whether it was useful, although a few people had returned to normal life after treatment. In vitro studies and animal studies have shown conflicting results in the efficacy of ribavirin against NiV and Hendra, with some studies showing effective inhibition of viral replication in cell lines, whereas some studies in animal models showed that ribavirin treatment only delayed but did not prevent death after NiV or Hendra virus infection.

In 2013 the anti-malarial drug chloroquine was shown to block the critical functions needed for maturation of Nipah virus, although no clinical benefit was observed.

Immunization 
Passive immunization using a human monoclonal antibody, m102.4, that targets the ephrin-B2 and ephrin-B3 receptor-binding domain of the henipavirus Nipah G glycoprotein was evaluated in the ferret model as post-exposure prophylaxis. m102.4 has been used in people on a compassionate use basis in Australia, and was in pre-clinical development in 2013.

Popular culture
The fictional MEV-1 virus featured in the 2011 film Contagion was based on a combination of Nipah and measles virus.

A Malayalam movie, Virus, was released in 2019, based on the 2018 outbreak of Nipah virus in Kerala, India.

In series 4 episode 1 of The Good Karma Hospital, a patient is admitted with Nipah.

Episode 7 of the Korean drama Doctor John also features a Nipah virus outbreak.

See also
 Coalition for Epidemic Preparedness Innovations

References 

Chiroptera-borne diseases
Swine diseases
Viral diseases
Wikipedia medicine articles ready to translate
Zoonoses